116th Infantry Regiment may refer to:
 116th Infantry Regiment (United States)
 116th Infantry Brigade Combat Team